The Comprehensive Peace Agreement (CPA), also known as the Naivasha Agreement, was an accord signed on January 9, 2005, by the Sudan People's Liberation Movement (SPLM) and the Government of Sudan. The CPA was meant to end the Second Sudanese Civil War, develop democratic governance countrywide, and share oil revenues. It also set a timetable for a Southern Sudanese independence referendum.

The peace process was encouraged by the Intergovernmental Authority on Development (IGAD), as well as IGAD-Partners, a consortium of donor countries.

Components 

The process resulted in the following agreements (also referred to as protocols):
  The Machakos Protocol (or Chapter I), signed in Machakos, Kenya on 20 July 2002. Agreement on broad principles of government and governance.
 The Protocol on Power Sharing (or Chapter II), signed in Naivasha, Kenya on 26 May 2004
 The Agreement on Wealth Sharing (or Chapter III), signed in Naivasha, Kenya on 7 January 2004
 The Protocol on the Resolution of the Conflict in Abyei Area (or Chapter IV), signed in Naivasha, Kenya on 26 May 2004
 The Protocol on the Resolution of the Conflict in Southern Kordofan and Blue Nile States (or Chapter V), signed in Naivasha, Kenya on 26 May 2004
 The Agreement on Security Arrangements (or Chapter VI), signed in Naivasha, Kenya on 25 September 2003
 The Permanent Ceasefire and Security Arrangements Implementation Modalities and Appendices (or Annexure I), signed in Naivasha, Kenya on 30 October 2004
 The Implementation Modalities and Global Implementation Matrix and Appendices (or Annexure II), signed in Naivasha, Kenya on 31 December 2004

The final, comprehensive agreement was signed on 9 January 2005 and marked the commencement of implementation activities.

Implementation

2007 Southern withdrawal 

On 11 October 2007, the SPLM withdrew from the government of national unity (GoNU), accusing the central government of violating the terms of the CPA.  In particular, the SPLM states that the Khartoum-based government, which is dominated by the National Congress Party, has failed to withdraw over 15,000 troops from southern oilfields and failed to implement the Protocol on Abyei.  The SPLM stated that it was not returning to war, while analysts noted that the agreement had been disintegrating for some time, notably because of international focus on the conflict in nearby Darfur.

The SPLM announced that it was rejoining the government on 13 December 2007, following an agreement.  The agreement states that the seat of government will rotate between Juba and Khartoum every three months, though it appears that this will be largely symbolic, as well as funding for a census (vital for the referendum) and a timetable for the withdrawal of troops across the border.

Northern Sudanese troops finally left Southern Sudan on 8 January 2008.

South Sudan Independence 

A referendum was held from 9 to 15 January 2011 to determine if South Sudan should declare its independence from Sudan, with 98.83% of the population voting for independence. It became independent as the Republic of South Sudan on 9 July 2011.

Popular Consultations 

Popular consultations for Blue Nile and South Kordofan were suspended as part of the ongoing conflict in those regions between the northern wing of the SPLA and the Justice and Equality Movement against the central government.

See also
 2011 South Sudanese independence referendum
 Assessment and Evaluation Commission
 Sudanese conflict in South Kordofan and Blue Nile
 UN Peacemaker

References and notes

External links 
 Full text of the Comprehensive Peace Agreement, UN Peacemaker
 Read all peace agreements for Sudan, UN Peacemaker
 UNMIS.org, the official web site of the United Nations Mission in Sudan (UNMIS)
 Updated Timeline of the Implementation of the Comprehensive Peace Agreement in Sudan, Center for International Peace Operations (ZIF), April 2009
 Sudan: Human Rights Accountability Must Be Part of North-South Peace Agreement, Human Rights Watch, November 2004
 "Sudan after the Naivasha Peace Agreement: No Champagne Yet" by Denis M. Tull, German Institute for International and Security Affairs, 3 February 2005
 The Khartoum-SPLM Agreement: Sudan's Uncertain Peace, International Crisis Group, 25 July 2005
 Sudan’s Comprehensive Peace Agreement: The Long Road Ahead, International Crisis Group, 31 March 2006
 Sudan’s Comprehensive Peace Agreement: Beyond the Crisis, International Crisis Group, 13 March 2008

Second Sudanese Civil War
Treaties concluded in 2005
Peace treaties of Sudan
2005 in South Sudan
2005 in Sudan
Treaties of South Sudan
South Sudan–Sudan relations
Sudanese peace process